The 1990–91 La Liga season, the 60th since its establishment, started on September 1, 1990, and finished on June 9, 1991. Barcelona ended Real Madrid's five-year run as champions to seal the title.

Team information

Clubs and locations

League table

Promotion playoff

First Leg

Second Leg

Results

Pichichi Trophy 

1990 1991
1990–91 in Spanish football leagues
Spain